Bharat Nana Bhalke (28 November  1960 – 28 November 2020) was an Indian politician and member of the Nationalist Congress Party. Bhalke served as a MLA from 2009 for Pandharpur, where he defeated Vijaysinh Mohite–Patil, until his death from post-COVID-19 complications in 2020.

References

1960s births
2020 deaths
People from Solapur district
Members of the Maharashtra Legislative Assembly
Nationalist Congress Party politicians from Maharashtra
Indian National Congress politicians from Maharashtra
Swabhimani Paksha politicians
Deaths from the COVID-19 pandemic in India